James Taylor (20 January 1700 – May 1747) was an Anglo-Irish politician.

Taylor was the youngest son of Sir Thomas Taylor, 1st Baronet and Anne Cotton, daughter of Sir Robert Cotton, 1st Baronet, of Combermere. Between 1737 and his death in 1747, Taylor was a Member of Parliament for Kells in the Irish House of Commons.

References

1700 births
1747 deaths
18th-century Anglo-Irish people
Irish MPs 1727–1760
Members of the Parliament of Ireland (pre-1801) for County Meath constituencies